Aimo Matias Mäenpää (30 January 1937 – 11 April 2018) was a Finnish wrestler who competed in the 1964 Summer Olympics and in the 1972 Summer Olympics.

References

External links
 

1937 births
2018 deaths
Olympic wrestlers of Finland
Wrestlers at the 1964 Summer Olympics
Wrestlers at the 1972 Summer Olympics
Finnish male sport wrestlers